Israel Frenkel (18 September 1853 – 1890) was a Polish-Jewish Hebraist, translator, and educator.

Biography
Frenkel was born in Radom, Poland in 1853. His mother, Neḥama , was a descendant of Yaakov Yitzḥak of Lublin, and his father, Shraga Frenkel, came from a scholarly Hasidic family.

He studied Talmudic literature under Rabbi Samuel Mohilever, at the same time studying Hebrew, German, and French.

His translations into Hebrew include Gotthold Ephraim Lessing's drama Miss Sara Sampson, under the title Sara bat Shimshon (Warsaw, 1887); the songs in metric verse in David Radner's translation of Schiller's Wilhelm Tell (Vilna, 1878); and 's drama Esterka, under the title Masʾa Ester (Warsaw, 1889), the heroine of which is Esterka, the mythical Jewish mistress of Casimir III the Great. Frenkel was also regular contributor to Ha-Tsfira, Ha-Shaḥar, Ha-Melitz, Ha-Maggid, and other Maskilic publications.

He died at age 37 during the 1889–1890 flu pandemic. His son Yechiel Frenkel would become a prominent writer and Zionist activist.

Partial bibliography

References
 

1853 births
1890 deaths
Translators to Hebrew
People from Radom
Jewish educators
Translators from German
Translators from Polish
19th-century Polish Jews
Deaths from the 1889–1890 flu pandemic
People of the Haskalah
Hovevei Zion